Archibald Blair (1752–1815) was a naval surveyor and lieutenant in the Bombay Marine.
He joined the Bombay Marine, received his first commission in 1771 and in 1792 was promoted captain. In 1772, as a midshipman, he went on his first survey mission along the coasts of India, Iran and Arabia. In 1780 he was lieutenant on a ship captured by a French man-of-war off the Cape of Good Hope. He was kept prisoner by the French until 1784 when they handed him over to the Dutch who returned him to the Bombay Marine that same year. He was given the then considerable sum of £200 on account of his long captivity and suffering. Between 1786 and 1788 he took part in a number of survey missions, to the Chagos archipelago, to Diamond Harbour south of Calcutta and to adjacent parts of the Hooghly river.

His first surveying voyage to the Andaman Islands took place between December 1788 and April 1789, as a result of which the Governor-general decided to colonise the islands in order to provide a safe harbour in the war against pirates. Blair had surveyed the islands in Viper and Elizabeth, discovering the fine natural harbour on South Andaman Island which he initially named Port Cornwallis (later renamed Port Blair), and establishing a fort on Chatham Island in the bay. He later returned to successfully establish a permanent colony, partly composed of convicts. In 1792 he was ordered to relocate the settlement to North Andaman Island and hand over command to Major Kyd.

His name also appears on maps as Blair's (or Blair) Harbour from some surveying in the South China Sea: his own chart of the Malay Peninsula, published in 1805, shows the site just as "A Good Harbour", although an earlier larger scale "Plan of Blair's Harbour" had been published in 1793.

Blair returned to England in 1795. He was elected a Fellow of the Royal Society in May, 1799, his candidacy citation describing him as " Archibald Blair Esqr of Bayford, Herts, Captain on the Maritime Establishment of the East India Company at Bombay a Gentleman distinguished in his profession and for astronomical observations and having been employed by The East India Company in forming an Establishment at the Andamans  ". He is recorded to have read an account of the Andaman Islands to the Society in London in 1799.

Retiring in 1800, he settled at Bayford, Hertfordshire.

In 1814 he was given the role of Director of works for the Porthleven Harbour Company, Cornwall.  It was here he directed the works which would build the harbour wall and create a safe harbour in Porthleven. From the 19th Aug 1813 he leased a property in a local village Treleven, Sithney for a total of £262.10 shillings.  The works on the harbour he would oversee would total a cost of £24,420.12.4.  He was to die while undertaking this work in Cornwall and was buried at Sithney Church.  He died on 25 March 1815 aged 63.

In 1803 he received a government commission in England on all cotton belonging to the Company and exported from Bombay as the reward for inventing a machine which made "a considerable improvement in the packing of cotton."

Andaman and Nicobar Islands's capital Port Blair is named after him.

References

1815 deaths
English sailors
Fellows of the Royal Society
Year of birth unknown
1752 births